The Senate Banking Subcommittee on National Security and International Trade and Finance is one of five subcommittees within the Senate Committee on Banking, Housing, and Urban Affairs.

Jurisdiction
The Subcommittee on Security and International Trade and Finance oversees export and foreign trade promotion, federal export controls and financing, international economic policy, and international financial and development institutions. International organizations or federal agencies that fall under its jurisdiction are the World Bank, the International Monetary Fund, the U.S. Export-Import Bank, the International Trade Administration, and the Bureau of Industry and Security.

Members, 118th Congress

Historical subcommittee rosters

117th Congress

Notes

References

External links
U.S. Senate Committee on Banking, Housing, and Urban Affairs
Senate Banking Committee subcommittee list and membership page
 

Banking Senate Security and International Trade and Finance